Teofilów may refer to the following places:
Teofilów, Gmina Drużbice in Łódź Voivodeship (central Poland)
Teofilów, Tomaszów Mazowiecki County in Łódź Voivodeship (central Poland)
Teofilów, Świętokrzyskie Voivodeship (south-central Poland)
Teofilów, Masovian Voivodeship (east-central Poland)